Snowbird is a common name for the dark-eyed junco (Junco hyemalis).

Snowbird may also refer to:

Places
Snowbird, Utah, an unincorporated area and associated ski resort in the United States
Snowbird Lake, a lake in the Northwest Territories, Canada
Snowbird Glacier, a hanging alpine glacier in the Talkeetna Mountains of Alaska, United States
Snowbird Mountain, a crest on the Appalachian Trail east of Del Rio, Tennessee, United States

People
Snowbird (person), someone from Canada or the northern United States who spends winter in warmer climates of the southern United States

Arts, entertainment, and media

Films
The Snowbird, a 1916 silent movie

Fictional characters
Snowbird (comics), a Marvel Comics character

Music
Snowbird (band), a band featuring Simon Raymonde and Stephanie Dosen
"Snowbird" (song), recorded by Anne Murray in 1970
"Snowbird", a song by Janis Ian from her 1969 album Who Really Cares
"Snowbirds and Townies", a song from the album The Moon Is Down by Further Seems Forever
 Snowbird (album)

Other uses
Snowbird (sailboat), an Olympic sailboat during the 1932 Summer Olympics
Snowbird Airlines, a charter airline in Finland
Snowbirds, a Canadian air show flight demonstration team
UTIAS Snowbird, a human-powered ornithopter built at University of Toronto Institute for Aerospace Studies, Canada
Snowbird Tectonic Zone (STZ) is a geological structure in the western Canadian Shield
Snowbird Mountain Lodge, an historic hotel property in rural Graham County, North Carolina, United States